Claire Wallace is Professor of Sociology at the University of Aberdeen and was President of the European Sociological Association between 2007 and 2009, during which she helped to organise the Annual Conference in Lisbon in 2009 and in Glasgow in 2007. She has also been editor in chief of the international journal European Societies between 2001 and 2006.

Claire Wallace has published more than 100 peer-reviewed publications.

Biography
Claire Wallace graduated from the University of Kent, where she undertook a PhD about young people on the Isle of Sheppey under the supervision of Ray Pahl. She subsequently worked at the University of Plymouth and Lancaster, before moving to Prague to help set up the Central European University (now in Budapest) together with Ernest Gellner funded by George Soros and was finally Head of Sociology and Politics.  She then moved to the Institute for Advanced Studies in Vienna, where she later became Head of Sociology. Since 2005 she has been working at the University of Aberdeen as Professor of Sociology, although she was Vice Principal for Research and Knowledge Exchange between 2011 and 2014 and before that Director of Research for the College of Arts and Social Science.

Work
Claire Wallace started her career on the pioneering Sheppey project with Ray Pahl looking at the transformations of work and employment for young people and households. She developed the idea of household work strategies in her later work in various European Union projects where she looked at all forms of work (domestic, employment, informal economy etc.) and how they were changing. This, together with her work on young people's transitions into adulthood, formed the basis of her early books. Whilst in Prague she became interested in East–West migration and published a series of papers and a book on this topic. She also wrote a series of papers about aspects of transition in Eastern Europe including ones on health, ethnic identity, work and well-being, as well as being involved in a series of project including ENRI-East, Health in Transition Times (HITT), Living Conditions, Lifestyles, and Health (LLH), Households, Work and Flexibility, and Workcare: Social Quality and the Changing Relationship between Work, Care and Welfare in Europe. These were continued through various research projects whilst in Vienna and Aberdeen. Since moving to Aberdeen she became co-investigator in the dot.rural Digital Economy Hub funded by the UK Research Council, where she looked at digital transformations of rural life. Over the last ten years she has been creating a model of well-being, quality of life and what makes a decent society by developing the Social quality model.

See also
Social quality

Key publications

References

External links
Profile on University of Aberdeen website
Profile on Communities & Culture Network+ website

Living people
1956 births
British sociologists
Alumni of the University of Kent
Academics of the University of Aberdeen